Novisuccinea is a genus of air-breathing land snails, terrestrial pulmonate gastropod mollusks in the family Succineidae, the ambersnails.

Species
Species in the genus Novisuccinea include:
 Novisuccinea ovalis (Say, 1817) - oval ambersnail
 Novisuccinea chittenangoensis (Pilsbry, 1908) - Chittenango ovate amber snail

References

Succineidae